Tetraspanins are a family of membrane proteins found in all multicellular eukaryotes.

Tetraspanins, also referred to as the transmembrane 4 superfamily (TM4SF) proteins, have four transmembrane alpha-helices and two extracellular domains, one short (called the small extracellular domain or loop, SED/SEL or EC1) and one longer, typically 100 amino acid residues (the large extracellular domain/loop, LED/LEL or EC2). Although several protein families have four transmembrane alpha-helices, tetraspanins are defined by conserved amino acid sequences including four or more cysteine residues in the EC2 domain, with two in a highly conserved 'CCG' motif. Tetraspanins are often thought to act as scaffolding proteins, anchoring multiple proteins to one area of the cell membrane.

Tetraspanins are highly conserved between species. Some tetraspanins can have N-linked glycosylations on the long extracellular loop (LEL, EC2) and palmitoylations at a CXXC motif in their transmembrane region.

There are 34 tetraspanins in mammals, 33 of which have also been identified in humans. Tetraspanins display numerous properties that indicate their physiological importance in cell adhesion, motility, activation, and proliferation, as well as their contribution to pathological conditions such as metastasis or viral infection.

A role for tetraspanins in platelets was demonstrated by the bleeding phenotypes of CD151- and TSSC6-deficient mice, which exhibit impaired "outside-in" signalling through αIIbβ3, the major platelet integrin. it is hypothesized that tetraspanins interact with and regulate other platelet receptors.

List of human tetraspanins

See also
 List of human clusters of differentiation

Relevance to parasite vaccines
The schistosome worms make two tetraspanins: TSP-1 and TSP-2. TSP-2 antibodies are found in some people who seem to have immunity to schistosome infection (Schistosomiasis).

References

External links
 InterPro on Tetraspanins

Integral membrane proteins
Protein domains
Immunology